The 2018 Florida Mayhem season was the first season of the Florida Mayhem's existence in the Overwatch League. The team ended the 2018 regular season with a  record, second-to-last in the League, and did not qualify for any stage playoffs or the season playoffs.

Preceding offseason 

On November 2, 2017, the Overwatch League announced that Misfits Gaming has purchased the Florida franchise slot for the league and would be branded as the Florida Mayhem. The team would be led by head coach Vytis "Mineral" Lasaitis, and all six of their players came from Misfits:

Kevin "TviQ" Lindström
Andreas "Logix" Berghmans
Aleksi "Zuppeh" Kuntsi
Sebastian "Zebbosai" Olsson
Johan "CWoosH" Klingestedt
Tim "Manneten" Bylund

Regular season 
On January 11, 2018, the Mayhem played their first Overwatch League match, a 1–3 loss to the London Spitfire. The following week, on January 19, they notched their first-ever victory, after defeating the Shanghai Dragons, 4–0. Looking to increase their roster size, as they only fielded the six-player league minimum at the time, the Mayhem signed tank player Joonas "zappis" Alakurtti on February 1. After finishing Stage 1 with a dismal 1–9 record, Florida picked up Ha "Sayaplayer" Jung-woo and Kim "aWesomeGuy" Sung, two South Korean players from team Meta Athena. The Mayhem had a slightly better record in Stage 2, largely due to the damage duo of Logix and Sayaplayer, going 3–7. However, the upward trend did not continue, as Florida would win only three more matches the entire season, which only included wins over the winless Shanghai Dragons and third-to-last place Dallas Fuel. Additionally, on May 2, just before the end of Stage 3, head coach Mineral temporarily stepped down from his position, citing that he had been experiencing "various health issues" and burnout since Stage 2. Assistant coach Choi "r2der" Hyun-jin and analyst Albert Yeh lead the team in his absence, until his return at the beginning of Stage 4. The team ended the 2018 regular season with a  record, second-to-last in the League — only ahead of only the winless Dragons. At the end of the season, Sayaplayer was named a reserve for the 2018 All-Star Game.

Final roster

Transactions 
Transactions of/for players on the roster during the 2018 regular season:
On February 1, Mayhem signed Joonas "zappis" Alakurtti.
On February 13, Mayhem signed Ha "Sayaplayer" Jeong-Woo and Kim "aWesomeGuy" Sung-Hoon.

Standings

Record by stage

League

Game log

Preseason

Regular season

References 

2018 Overwatch League seasons by team
Florida Mayhem
Florida Mayhem seasons